Stewart County High School (formerly Stewart-Quitman High School), established in 1973, is located in Lumpkin, Georgia, United States. As of 2009, It serves the entirety of Stewart County, Georgia. In January 2018, the school merged into one complex with Stewart County Middle and Elementary School after renovations and the building of a new gymnasium were completed.

Ties with Quitman County 

Following the burning of Georgetown High School in 1978, students from Quitman County attended Stewart County High School (then known as Stewart-Quitman High). In 2007 Quitman County approved the building of a new high school in Georgetown, Georgia, and in 2009; Quitman County High School opened.

Athletics 
The school has teams for football, men's and women's basketball, men's and women's track and field, women's volleyball, and baseball and currently play in Class A Public Region 5. Their mascot is the Royal Knight. While the basketball and volleyball teams play at the new school building's gymnasium, the baseball and football teams currently play at the fields from the old Stewart County High School Building. The football field is nicknamed "Knight's Field."

Extra-Curricular Activities 
The School offers Dual-Enrollment Classes with Columbus Technical College, which offers certification credits in Nursing and Business. The school also offers several electives such as JROTC, Drama, and Music Education Courses. The school also has an academic team that travels to academic competitions in the area.

References

External links
School web page

1973 establishments in Georgia (U.S. state)
Educational institutions established in 1973
Public high schools in Georgia (U.S. state)
Schools in Stewart County, Georgia